Tai'an Township / Taian Township is a mountain indigenous township in southeastern Miaoli County, Taiwan. It is the largest township and the only mountain indigenous township in Miaoli County.

Geography
Tai'an Township is a mountainous region without convenient transportation both between villages and between Tai'an itself and outside townships. The sources of the Houlong and Da-an rivers are found in the township. More than two thirds of the population consists of the indigenous Atayal people.

Area: 
Population: 5,735 people (January 2023)

Administrative divisions

The township comprises eight villages: Bagua, Daxing, Jinshui, Meiyuan, Qingan, Shilin, Xiangbi and Zhongxing.

Politics
The township is part of Miaoli County Constituency II electoral district for Legislative Yuan.

Tourist attractions
 Guanwu National Forest Recreation Area
 Shei-Pa National Park
 Tai'an Hot Spring
 Xishuikeng Tofu Street

References

External links

  

Townships in Miaoli County